Kokshetau Central Bus Terminal is a bus terminal located in the city of Kokshetau, the capital of Akmola Region in the northern part of Kazakhstan for intercity, interregional and international routes daily.

Located in the north of the city, it was opened in 1981. Terminal has 8 platforms for buses. The terminal is situated at the address 8 Vernadsky street, and provides hassle-free transfer to the nearby Kokshetau Railway Station.

History 
The bus station building was built in 1981. It is a two-storey terminal. The station has 8 platforms situated in front of the east side of the main building. There are about 50 people that are employed in the terminus.

Services
There are frequent buses running to Astana, Karaganda, Pavlodar, Petropavl, Rudny, Temirtau. There are also coaches that service to neighbouring countries. Buses also run from Kokshetau to Yekaterinburg, Omsk, Tobolsk, Tyumen, Kurgan and Bishkek.

See also

 List of highways in Kazakhstan
 Transport in Kazakhstan

References

Bus stations in Kazakhstan
Buildings and structures in Kokshetau
Transport in Kokshetau
Transport infrastructure completed in 1981
Buildings and structures in Akmola Region